Tunocaria is a genus of moths of the family Noctuidae. There is only one species in this genus, Tunocaria rubiginosa, that is known from Madagascar.

References

Viette, P. 1961b. Descriptions préliminaires de nouvelles espèces de noctuelles de Madagascar IV (Lep. Noctuidae). - Bulletin de la Société entomologique de France 66:42–54.

Cuculliinae
Moths of Madagascar
Owlet moths of Africa
Noctuoidea genera
Monotypic moth genera